This family represents the vascular endothelial growth factor (VEGF) internal ribosome entry site (IRES) A. VEGF is an endothelial cell mitogen with many crucial functions such as embryogenic development and wound healing. The 5' UTR of VEGF mRNA contains two IRES elements which are able to promote efficient translation at the AUG start codon, this family represents IRES A.

References

External links 
 

Cis-regulatory RNA elements